The Official Dreamcast Magazine (commonly abbreviated as ODCM and formerly known as Official Sega Dreamcast Magazine) was a video game magazine for the Dreamcast published in the United States. The magazine's initial issue "0" was released in June 1999, a full 3 months before the launch of the system. This issue featured Sonic the Hedgehog on a black cover, along with the launch date and some of the system's unique features. The magazine then ran for twelve issues from the September 1999 Dreamcast launch to March/April 2001, shortly after Dreamcast was discontinued. Starting with issue 2, each issue came with a GD-ROM with demos of Dreamcast games. The final issue did not come with a disc. This was explained as Sega looking for a new way to distribute demos. The cancellation was apparently unexpected as the magazine promised more information about demo distribution in future issues and had a preview for the next issue where Phantasy Star Online was to be reviewed. Many of the staff went on to work for Official Xbox Magazine.

The magazine was published bimonthly, but during the 2000 holiday season, issues were sold monthly due to additional relevant content being available for the shopping season.

References

External links
Archived Official Dreamcast Magazine (US) on the Internet Archive

1999 establishments in the United States
2001 disestablishments in the United States
Bimonthly magazines published in the United States
Monthly magazines published in the United States
Video game magazines published in the United States
Defunct magazines published in the United States
Magazines established in 1999
Magazines disestablished in 2001
Sega magazines
Dreamcast